Andrew Michael Stahl  (born 1954 in London) is a British painter who lives and works in the United Kingdom (UK). He is known for his large figurative paintings. He is a Professor of Fine Art and Head of Undergraduate Painting at the Slade School of Fine Art.

In 1979, he won the Abbey Major Scholarship and spent two years in Rome. He returned to the UK for his first solo show in London at the Arts Council-funded AIR Gallery in 1981. Since then, his works have been shown widely internationally.

In 2000 Stahl did a British Council funded residency at Chiang Mai University. Much of his recent work reflects on travels to Japan and Thailand and addresses the conflation of time, space and cultures that long-haul travel brings. His paintings approach cultural differences and connections using pictorial language, imagination and figuration. Images become vehicles to carry painterly experimentation. This was underpinned by a further series of residencies in Thailand, plus residencies in Australia (Sydney) and China (Guangzhou).

Recent solo shows have been hosted at places including Robert Steele Gallery, New York City and Matthew Bown Gallery, London, 2007; as well as Anywhere Anytime Anyhow, Ardel Gallery Bangkok 2009. New Paintings, Robert Steele Gallery, New York, 2010 is a two-person show with Panya Vijinthanasarn hosted in 2014 at Thavibu Gallery Bangkok. Group shows include the British Council show Monologue/Dialogue featuring artists from the UK and Thailand, Part 1 in Bangkok, 2006 and Part 2 in London, 2008; Stew, Artspace, London, 2008; Same as it ever was, University of the Arts, London, 2008; Painting of the 80s, Matthew Bown Gallerie, Berlin, 2009 and Select, Peppercannister Gallery, Dublin, 2010. In June 2014, being interested in transcultural interaction, Stahl both curated and participated in Monologue/Dialogue 3 Fragility and Monumentality, a group show at the BACC in Bangkok, Thailand of 12 British and Thai Artists funded by the British Council and the Thai Ministry of Culture.

References

External links 
 Stahl at Slade School of Fine Art, UCL

1954 births
Living people
Academics of the Slade School of Fine Art
20th-century British painters
British male painters
21st-century British painters
20th-century British male artists
21st-century British male artists